The Peruvian Civil War of 1865 was the fourth internal conflict in 19th century Peru.

See also
Chincha Islands War

References
 Basadre Grohmann, Jorge: Historia de la República del Perú (1822 - 1933), Tomo 5. Editada por la Empresa Editora El Comercio S. A. Lima, 2005.  (V.5)
 Chirinos Soto, Enrique: Historia de la República (1821-1930). Tomo I. Lima, AFA Editores Importadores S.A., 1985.
 Vargas Ugarte, Rubén: Historia General del Perú. Noveno Tomo: La República (1844-1879). Segunda Edición.  Editor Carlos Milla Batres. Lima, Perú, 1984. Depósito Legal: B. 22436-84 (IX).

Wars involving Peru
1865 in Peru